Fort Benton is a city in and the county seat of Chouteau County, Montana, United States.  Established in 1846, Fort Benton is the oldest continuously occupied settlement in Montana. Fort Benton was the most upstream navigable port on the Mississippi River System, and is considered "the world’s innermost port".

The city's waterfront area, the most important aspect of its 19th century growth, was designated the Fort Benton Historic District, a National Historic Landmark, in 1961.

The population was 1,449 at the 2020 census.

History
Established in 1846 by Alexander Culbertson, who worked for Auguste Chouteau and Pierre Chouteau, Jr. of St. Louis, the original fort was the last fur trading post on the Upper Missouri River, the fort became an important economic center. For 30 years, the port attracted steamboats carrying goods, merchants, gold miners and settlers, coming from New Orleans, Memphis, St. Louis, Hannibal, Bismarck, Kansas City, etc. As the terminus for the 642-mile-long Mullan Road, completed by the United States Army in 1860, and at the head of navigation of the Missouri River, Fort Benton was part of the overland link between trade on the Missouri and the Columbia River, at Fort Walla Walla, Washington. Twenty thousand migrants used the road in the first year to travel to the Northwest. It became an important route for miners from both directions going into the interior of Idaho, and north to Canada.  Steamboat travel to Fort Benton from St. Louis, Missouri, helped broadly fuel the development of the American West between 1860 and 1890, when it was supplanted by railroad transport. The river was an important route for miners to the newly discovered gold fields of southern Montana at what became Bannack and Virginia City beginning in 1862, and Helena, beginning in 1865.

With the decline of the fur trade, the American Fur Company sold the fort to the Northwest Fur Company in 1865, and the fort became a U.S. Army post from 1868 until the army units departed in 1881. Founder Alexander Culbertson formally named it Fort Benton on Christmas Day 1850, in honor of Missouri Senator Thomas Hart Benton of Missouri.  Beginning in the early 1860s, with the arrival of the first steamboats, a town began to grow up around the fort. Besides being one of the most important ports on the Missouri-Mississippi river system, Fort Benton was once the "World's Innermost Port" – the furthest point of navigable water on the Missouri River.  It was served by numerous well-known "mountain boats" (designed for the Missouri River), including the Yellowstone and the Far West, and their famed captains, Joseph LaBarge and Grant Marsh, respectively.

Fort Benton's importance in trade was superseded by the construction of transcontinental railroads in the late 19th century. In 1867, Fort Benton was the site where Union General Thomas Francis Meagher, then acting governor of Montana Territory, fell overboard from his steamboat and drowned in the river; his body was never recovered. On July 5, 1988 the Fort Benton area was struck by an F3 tornado that injured two people.

Conflict with Natives 

In 1869, Mountain Chief, then Chief of the Pikuni Blackfeet Indians, travelled to the town of Fort Benton to request the agent of his reservation to remove illegal whiskey traders from Blackfeet land. The chief was physically assaulted by a gang of white residents. In the same year, Mountain Chief's brother and a teenage boy were assassinated in Fort Benton, supposedly in retaliation for the death of a white cattle rancher near to the town. In both cases, officials neglected to file criminal charges on behalf of these three Blackfeet Indians. In 1870, a group of 10 Blackfeet Indians would be killed by Fort Benton soldiers and vigilantes for the alleged crime of cattle raiding.

Geography

Fort Benton is located at  (47.819307, -110.669726). It is located off U.S. Route 87

The community sits in a narrow river valley on the west bank of the Missouri River and is in a geographic area known as the Golden Triangle (one of several dozen folk regions of Montana) due to the strength of the wheat industry of the region. For example, in 2007, Chouteau County was one of two counties in the United States with the highest wheat production. The long summer days (due to being at almost 48 degrees N latitude) and fertile soil of the area (due in part to ash deposits from the Elkhorn Volcanics to the south) leads to exceptionally "hard" wheat (high protein content) thriving in the area.

Fort Benton experiences a semi-arid climate (Köppen BSk) with cold, dry winters and hot, wetter summers.
{{Weather box 
|location = Fort Benton, Montana (1991–2020 normals); extremes since 1898
|single line = Y
|Jan record high F = 71
|Feb record high F = 77
|Mar record high F = 83
|Apr record high F = 93
|May record high F = 97
|Jun record high F = 104
|Jul record high F = 106
|Aug record high F = 109
|Sep record high F = 104
|Oct record high F = 94
|Nov record high F = 79
|Dec record high F = 73
|year record high F = 109
|Jan avg record high F = 60
|Feb avg record high F = 61
|Mar avg record high F = 71
|Apr avg record high F = 80
|May avg record high F = 86
|Jun avg record high F = 92
|Jul avg record high F = 99
|Aug avg record high F = 99
|Sep avg record high F = 94
|Oct avg record high F = 83
|Nov avg record high F = 69
|Dec avg record high F = 60
|year avg record high F = 101
|Jan high F = 34.6
|Feb high F = 38.1
|Mar high F = 48.2
|Apr high F = 58.6
|May high F = 68.3
|Jun high F = 76.3
|Jul high F = 86.4
|Aug high F = 85.5
|Sep high F = 74.2
|Oct high F = 59.9
|Nov high F = 46.5
|Dec high F = 36.7
|year high F = 
|Jan mean F = 22.6
|Feb mean F = 25.3
|Mar mean F = 34.3
|Apr mean F = 44.6
|May mean F = 54.4
|Jun mean F = 62.5
|Jul mean F = 70.3
|Aug mean F = 68.8
|Sep mean F = 58.3
|Oct mean F = 45.2
|Nov mean F = 33.7
|Dec mean F = 24.9
|year mean F = 
|Jan low F = 10.1
|Feb low F = 12.6
|Mar low F = 20.3
|Apr low F = 30.6
|May low F = 40.6
|Jun low F = 48.6
|Jul low F = 54.1
|Aug low F = 52.1
|Sep low F = 42.3
|Oct low F = 30.5
|Nov low F = 21.0
|Dec low F = 13.1
|year low F = 
|Jan avg record low F = -18
|Feb avg record low F = -11
|Mar avg record low F = 0
|Apr avg record low F = 15
|May avg record low F = 27
|Jun avg record low F = 38
|Jul avg record low F = 44
|Aug avg record low F = 41
|Sep avg record low F = 30
|Oct avg record low F = 13
|Nov avg record low F = -3
|Dec avg record low F = -12
|year avg record low F = -26
|Jan record low F = −49
|Feb record low F = −44
|Mar record low F = −35
|Apr record low F = −8
|May record low F = 14
|Jun record low F = 29
|Jul record low F = 34
|Aug record low F = 29
|Sep record low F = 17
|Oct record low F = −15
|Nov record low F = −29
|Dec record low F = −45
|year record low F = −49
|precipitation colour = green
|Jan precipitation inch = 0.52
|Feb precipitation inch = 0.44
|Mar precipitation inch = 0.56
|Apr precipitation inch = 1.48
|May precipitation inch = 2.08
|Jun precipitation inch = 2.62
|Jul precipitation inch = 1.19
|Aug precipitation inch = 1.16
|Sep precipitation inch = 1.20
|Oct precipitation inch = 0.92
|Nov precipitation inch = 0.58
|Dec precipitation inch = 0.47
|year precipitation inch = 
|Jan snow inch = 7.9
|Feb snow inch = 6.9
|Mar snow inch = 4.3
|Apr snow inch = 3.0
|May snow inch = 0.3
|Jun snow inch = 0.0
|Jul snow inch = 0.0
|Aug snow inch = 0.0
|Sep snow inch = 0.3
|Oct snow inch = 1.9
|Nov snow inch = 5.7
|Dec snow inch = 7.9
|year snow inch = 
|source 1= NOAA (normals, 1991–2020)<ref name=NowData>

Demographics

2010 census
As of the census of 2010, there were 1,464 people, 686 households, and 412 families residing in the city. The racial makeup of the city was 97.4% White, 0.1% African American, 0.5% Native American, 0.2% Asian, 0.1% from other races, and 1.7% from two or more races. Hispanic or Latino of any race were 0.6% of the population.

There were 686 households, of which 20.8% had children under the age of 18 living with them, 48.3% were married couples living together, 7.6% had a female householder with no husband present, 4.2% had a male householder with no wife present, and 39.9% were non-families. 37.0% of all households were made up of individuals, and 18.6% had someone living alone who was 65 years of age or older. The average household size was 2.08 and the average family size was 2.67.

The median age in the city was 52.1 years. 17.6% of residents were under the age of 18; 5.1% were between the ages of 18 and 24; 17% were from 25 to 44; 32.7% were from 45 to 64; and 27.7% were 65 years of age or older. The gender makeup of the city was 47.5% male and 52.5% female.

2000 census

As of the census of 2000, there were 1,594 people, 636 households, and 422 families residing in the city. The population density was 763.2 people per square mile (294.5/km2). There were 731 housing units at an average density of 350.0 per square mile (135.0/km2). The racial makeup of the city was 97.68% White, 0.19% African American, 0.56% Native American, 0.38% Asian, 0.38% from other races, and 0.82% from two or more races. Hispanic or Latino of any race were 0.56% of the population.

There were 636 households, out of which 30.7% had children under the age of 18 living with them, 54.4% were married couples living together, 9.3% had a female householder with no husband present, and 33.5% were non-families. 31.0% of all households were made up of individuals, and 14.5% had someone living alone who was 65 years of age or older. The average household size was 2.34 and the average family size was 2.93.

In the city, the population was spread out, with 24.8% under the age of 18, 6.2% from 18 to 24, 23.1% from 25 to 44, 22.3% from 45 to 64, and 23.6% who were 65 years of age or older. The median age was 43 years. For every 100 females, there were 92.3 males. For every 100 females age 18 and over, there were 84.2 males.

The median income for a household in the city was $29,406, and the median income for a family was $32,072. Males had a median income of $22,813 versus $20,787 for females. The per capita income for the city was $14,861. About 11.6% of families and 13.4% of the population were below the poverty line, including 16.6% of those under age 18 and 6.7% of those age 65 or over.

Infrastructure
Fort Benton Airport is a public use airport located one mile northeast of town.

Education
Fort Benton Public School educates students from kindergarten through 12th grade. They are known as the Longhorns. Fort Benton High School is a Class C school.

Choteau County Library is headquartered in Fort Benton.

Media
Fort Benton is home to radio station KYPZ.

Notable people

 Denise Curry, basketball player and coach.
 Eleanor Dumont (1834-1879), also known as Madame Moustache, professional card dealer and gambler
 Charles S. Hartman, United States Congressman.
 William Henry Hunt, state and federal judge, and governor of Puerto Rico.
 Daniel Webster Marsh, mayor of Calgary, Alberta.
 Charles Nelson Pray, United States Congressman.
 U.S. Grant Sharp, Jr., four-star admiral and Commander-in-Chief of the United States Pacific Fleet

See also
 Shep, dog who famously waited for his owner in Fort Benton

References

Sources

External links
 City website
 Fort Benton National Historic Landmark
 Mining and the Mullan Military Road 

Cities in Chouteau County, Montana
County seats in Montana
Montana populated places on the Missouri River
1846 establishments in Montana
American frontier
Cities in Montana
Forts along the Missouri River